Jon Jarl was a Swedish jarl at the end of the 12th and in the early 13th centuries. He is mentioned in Eric's Chronicle from the 1320s to have spent years fighting against Russians and Ingrians in the early Swedish-Novgorodian Wars. No historical evidence on the jarl exists, although some believe he may be the same "Johannes Dux" who lies buried in the Linköping Cathedral.

According to a 15th-century historian Ericus Olai, he was murdered at his home in Asknäs in Ekerö parish by the Lake Mälaren in 1206, allegedly by Russian pirates.

Earl
According to the Eric's Chronicle, Jon Jarl was a Swedish earl in the east tasked with the protection of the kingdom against Russians and Ingrians. Sven Tunberg considers it likely that the earl belonged to the Sverker family and that he was King Sverker the Younger's "Finnish earl" for nine years.

Death According to Eric's Chronicle
According to the Eric's Chronicle, after being away for nine years, Jon Jarl was killed on his farm at Askanäs on Ekerö by Karelian or Russian pirates the same night that he returned from a crusade between Ingrians and Russians.

The Chronicle states:

Thz er swa sant som jak her læss
Jon jerl ward dræpin i askaness

Jon's wife fled across the bay to Hundhamra (i.e. Norsborg), and gathered a mob to kill the perpetrators.

They caught up and fought them off at "Eesta skär" (i.e.

How accurately the chronicle reproduces the actual sequence of events is unclear.

Tombstone

An undated tombstone in Linköping Cathedral labelled "Johannes dux" and "the terror of the heathens" is probably that of Jon Jarl.

References 

12th-century Swedish people
13th-century Swedish people
12th-century births
13th-century deaths
Date of birth unknown
Swedish jarls